Symphonia is a genus of tropical woody plants, specifically trees in the family Clusiaceae. The genus has its diversity center in Madagascar and one species (Symphonia globulifera) disjunct in the Afrotropic and the Neotropic in the Amazon Rainforest.

Because of this particular distribution pattern, the origin of the genus is controversial:  two hypotheses have been proposed, one suggesting an Amazon origin, the other a Madagascar origin.

Species
, The Plant List accepts 15 species:

Symphonia eugenioides Baker
Symphonia fasciculata (Noronha ex Thouars) Vesque
Symphonia globulifera L.f.
Symphonia gymnoclada (Planch. & Triana) Benth. & Hook.f. ex Vesque
Symphonia lepidocarpa Baker
Symphonia linearis H.Perrier
Symphonia louvelii Jum. & H.Perrier
Symphonia microphylla (Hils. & Bojer ex Cambess.) Benth. & Hook.f. ex Vesque
Symphonia nectarifera Jum. & H.Perrier
Symphonia oligantha Baker
Symphonia pauciflora Baker
Symphonia sessiliflora H.Perrier
Symphonia tanalensis Jum. & H.Perrier
Symphonia urophylla (Decne. ex Planch. & Triana) Benth. & Hook.f. ex Vesque
Symphonia verrucosa (Hils. & Bojer ex Planch. & Triana) Benth. & Hook.f.

References

External links

 
Malpighiales genera